Andrea Vinai (1824–1893) was an Italian painter.

Biography
He was born in Pianvignale, Frabosa Sottana , on the 4th of March 1824, near Mondovì in Piedmont. As a young boy he apprenticed in Cuneo, under the painter Pastore, then traveled to Rome, where he frequented the Academy of San Luca, winning a stipend until 1848. He left Rome to join in the Wars of Italian Independence, and was wounded in the battle of Cornuda at Treviso. For this effort he was awarded a medal of military valor, and rose to level of captain. After the war, he returned to the Piedmont, where he painted mainly religious subjects. For example, in the Cathedral of Mondovi, he painted:
Presbytery:  Coronation of the Virgin and Four Prophets
Ceiling of San Grato: San Francesco di Sales
Chapel of San Giuseppe
Chapel of San Biagio
Second Chapel at left: Cena Domini

He also painted in the cathedrals of Saluzzo and Ceva; and churches in Carassone, Pallare, Nole, Sommariva Perno, Boves, Carrù, Santa Vittoria d'Alba, Madonna dell'Olmo, Peveragno, Trinità, Garessio, and Cuneo. He completed many religious paintings in Cuneo, Mondovi, Novara, Alessandria, Chiusa di Pesio in Valle Pesio, and Casale Monferrato. In 1846 for the Crematorium of Turin, he completed a portrait of the King and of Pio IX, in 1846. Vinai taught art in public schools.

References

1824 births
1893 deaths
19th-century Italian painters
Italian male painters
Painters from Piedmont
19th-century Italian male artists
People from Frabosa Sottana